John Van Wisse born during 1972 or 1973 is a veteran Australian swimmer and swim coach. He has been swimming since at least the 1990s.
Van Wisse set a record when he ran, swam and cycled from London to Paris.

Swimming
Van Wisse swims to make money for charity.
Van Wisse started training at the Brighton swimming Baths when he was a teenager.
Dawn Fraser is someone Van Wisse says he credits to for his endurance.
Van Wisse trained the youngest swimmer to swim the triple crown Dan Canta.

British-Australian comedian David Brooks created a movie Crossing the Line: John van Wisse about Van Wisse's  record-breaking Arch 2 Arc ultra-triathlon in August 2014.

Personal life 
Van Wisse is the brother of fellow long distance swimmer Tammy van Wisse.

References

Australian long-distance swimmers